Jordan L. Kannianen (born August 1983) is an American politician for the Republican Party who has served as a member of the North Dakota Senate from the 4th District since 2017.

Early life 
Kannianen graduated from Minot State University with a Master of Science in Management.

Personal life 
Kannianen has eleven children with his wife, Elizabeth, whom he currently lives with in Belden, North Dakota. He is a Director on the Sikes Township Board, the President of the Belden Finnish Cemetery Association, a Stake High Counselor and member of the Church of Jesus Christ of Latter-day Saints. After the LeBarón and Langford families massacre, Kannianen and his wife spoke out about the event, as they had personally known Rhonita Miller and her children, who were victims of the shooting.

References 

1983 births
Living people
People from Mountrail County, North Dakota
Minot State University alumni
Latter Day Saints from North Dakota
North Dakota Republicans
21st-century American politicians